Divergent Spectrum is the sixth studio album by American DJ, Bassnectar. The album was released on August 2, 2011 through his label Amorphous Music. The album included remixes of and collaborations with a number of artists spanning numerous genres of music. Within the first 10 hours of its release, Divergent Spectrum reached number 6 on iTunes Top 10 for album sales.

Track listing

Charts

References

http://www.bassnectar.net/release/divergent-spectrum/
http://www.bassnectar.net/2011/06/divergent-spectrum-tour-west-coast-2011/

2011 albums
Bassnectar albums